Acela is a train service operated by Amtrak.

Acela may also refer to:
 Acela Express (trainset) – the rolling stock used on the train service
 Northeast Regional – once known briefly as "Acela Regional"
 Clocker (train) – once known briefly as "Acela Commuter"
 Acela (company) - an American company that remanufactures the FMTV tactical truck